Boulder Creek is a  creek draining the Rocky Mountains to the west of Boulder, Colorado, as well as the city itself and surrounding plains.

Route 
The creek is formed by two main tributaries rising along the Continental Divide: North and Middle Boulder Creek; and later joined by South Boulder Creek.

North Boulder Creek forms in a valley between Navajo Peak and Arikaree Peak on the Continental Divide, in the Green Lakes chain of lakes. The creek flows  past the community of Switzerland Park to join Middle Boulder Creek.

Middle Boulder Creek rises as two forks from the Continental Divide: the North Fork rises in a cirque below Mount Neva and flows  to the South Fork. The South Fork rises at Rollins Pass on the Continental Divide and flows  to the North Fork.

From its source at the confluence of the North and Middle Boulder forks, Boulder Creek flows down Boulder Canyon and through downtown Boulder. On the east edge of the city, the creek receives South Boulder Creek, which rises at Rogers Pass on the Continental Divide, just south of the Moffat Tunnel. South Boulder Creek flows  through Rollinsville, Gross Reservoir, and Eldorado Canyon before leaving the mountains and curving past the south and east sides of Boulder to its mouth at Boulder Creek.

After leaving the city, Boulder Creek flows northeast into Weld County, where it joins St. Vrain Creek, and on to a confluence with the Platte River. Its waters ultimately flow into the Mississippi River and the Gulf of Mexico.

Recreation 
Boulder Creek is a summer recreational spot for outdoor activities including tubing, fly fishing, and wading. The annual Boulder Creek Festival, held along the creekside civic area between the library and Central Park, opens the summer season on Memorial Day weekend.

Fish species 
Fish surveys from 1990, 1995, and 2006 found the following species of fish in Boulder Creek.

See also
 List of rivers of Colorado

References

External links
 Boulder Creek Report

Rivers of Colorado
Tributaries of the Platte River
Rivers of Boulder County, Colorado